Utrecht Terwijde is a railway station on the Utrecht–Rotterdam railway. It is located between Vleuten and Utrecht Leidsche Rijn stations.

The Terwijde neighbourhood is part of the Leidsche Rijn area under construction, west of Utrecht.
Because of the large number of Commuters in this area, a temporary railway station was built in 2003. And in 2005 construction started next to this station for the actual station, which opened on 5 November 2007.

Utrecht Terwijde railway station is part of a large project of expanding the two track line to four tracks on this stretch of the railway, which was completed in 2011.

Train services
The following services call at Utrecht Terwijde:
2x per hour local service (sprinter) The Hague - Gouda - Utrecht
2x per hour local service (sprinter) Woerden - Utrecht

Bus services
 4 (Zuilen - Centraal Station - Leidsche Rijn - Utrecht Terwijde)

References
NS website
U OV website
Dutch public transport planner

Terwijde